The Arieșul Mic is a river in the Apuseni Mountains, Alba County, western Romania. It is the right headwater of the river Arieș. It flows through the villages Avram Iancu and Vidra, and joins the Arieșul Mare (the other headwater) in Mihoești near Câmpeni.

Tributaries
The following rivers are tributaries to the river Arieșul Mic (from source to mouth):

Left: Micoaia, Libărțana, Valea Boului, Drăghița, Slatina and Valea Lungă
Right: Divaia, Cioha, Păltiniș, Dobrani, Vidrișoara and Valea Dolii

References

Rivers of Romania
Rivers of Alba County